Naanu Nanna Hendthi is a 1985 Kannada-language romantic drama film directed by D. Rajendra Babu and written by K. S. Satyanarayan. The film stars V. Ravichandran, Urvashi and Leelavathi. The soundtrack and score composition was by Shankar–Ganesh and the film was produced by N. Veeraswamy. D. Rajendra Babu made his Bollywood debut in 1987, with the remake version of this movie, titled as Pyaar Karke Dekho. The song Akkipete Lakkamma was retained in the Hindi version as Haki Petai Lakamma- both sung by S. P. Balasubrahmanyam. The film was a remake of Telugu film Nenu Maa Aavida. The film was also remade in Tamil as Kanna Thorakkanum Saami.

Plot 
The musician comes to town to find a job in Akashwani.

After the job, he finds it hard to find a home for a bachelor.

He tells a lie that he is a married man. To fill the truth to the house owner who keeps pestering him to show photo of his wife, he gets a random photo of a girl from a photo studio.

But that girl comes in real to his home and starts acting as his real wife.

The story revolves around his fight and difficulty to remove her.

MUSIC

All songs were super hit.

Cast 
 V. Ravichandran as Ravi
 Urvashi as Urvashi
 Leelavathi as Leelavathamma
 Mukhyamantri Chandru as Urvashi's Father
 N. S. Rao as N. S. Rao
 Umashree as N. S. Rao's Wife
 Krishne Gowda as Director of Akashavani
 B. K. Shankar
 Anuradha

Soundtrack 
The music was composed by Shankar–Ganesh, with lyrics by Hamsalekha. All the songs were received extremely well. The songs "Karunada Thayi", "Yaare Neenu Roja" and "Yaare Neenu Cheluve" found widespread appreciation upon release. The song "Yaare Neenu Roja" was remixed in the film Saheba (2017) starring V. Ravichandran's son Manoranjan.

References

External links 
 

1985 films
1980s Kannada-language films
1985 romantic drama films
Films scored by Shankar–Ganesh
Kannada films remade in other languages
Indian romantic drama films
Films directed by D. Rajendra Babu
Kannada remakes of Telugu films